Johann Serge Obiang (born 5 July 1993) is a professional footballer who plays as a left back for Caen. He previously played for Troyes and Châteauroux. Born in France, he represents Gabon at international level.

Club career
On 28 June 2022, Obiang signed with Caen.

International career
Obiang was born in France, to a Gabonese father and French mother. Also eligible for both the French and Gabonese national teams, he received his first called up to the Gabon national team in February 2014. Obiang was featured for Gabon national team in the 2021 AFCON tournament in Cameroon.

Career statistics
.

References

External links
 
 

1993 births
Living people
People from Le Blanc
Sportspeople from Indre
People with acquired Gabonese citizenship
Gabonese footballers
Gabon international footballers
French footballers
Gabonese people of French descent
French sportspeople of Gabonese descent
Association football defenders
LB Châteauroux players
ES Troyes AC players
Le Puy Foot 43 Auvergne players
Rodez AF players
Stade Malherbe Caen players
Ligue 1 players
Ligue 2 players
Championnat National players
2015 Africa Cup of Nations players
2017 Africa Cup of Nations players
2021 Africa Cup of Nations players
Footballers from Centre-Val de Loire